Maria Magdalena Łubieńska, also known as Countess Łubieńska (1833–1920) was a Polish artist and educator, of noble descent.

Life and career 
Łubieńska born in 1833 to business man Henryk Łubieński and his wife Irena (née Potocka). She was home educated. At age 22, she married her cousin, Paweł Łubieński, who had one previous marriage, and together they had five children. She worked painting in watercolors and oils, as well as drawing. It was common for Polish noble women at the time to learn skills like art making, however most ended the practice after marriage unless there were life circumstances that forced it as a livelihood.

Łubieńska founded the School of Drawing and Painting, in operations between 1867 and until approx. 1910. Her school became famous for the production of stained glass, which was often installed in Gothic Revival churches in the Kingdom of Poland, but also in other partitions and in the depths of Russia.

Łubieńska died in 1920.

See also 
 List of Polish women artists

References 

1833 births
1920 deaths
19th-century Polish women artists
20th-century Polish women artists
20th-century Polish painters